Fredericton South is a provincial electoral district for the Legislative Assembly of New Brunswick, Canada.  It was first contested in the 2014 general election, having been created in the 2013 redistribution of electoral boundaries by combining portions of the former districts of Fredericton-Lincoln and Fredericton-Silverwood.

The district includes the downtown and uptown areas of the southside of the City of Fredericton, including Fredericton City Hall, the Legislative Assembly of New Brunswick, the University of New Brunswick and Saint Thomas University.

Green Party leader David Coon was elected MLA in 2014 and re-elected in 2018 and 2020.

Members of the Legislative Assembly

Election results

External links 
Website of the Legislative Assembly of New Brunswick
Map of Fredericton South riding as of 2018

References

New Brunswick provincial electoral districts
Politics of Fredericton